is a JR West Geibi Line station located in Kawatō, Tōjō-chō, Shōbara, Hiroshima Prefecture, Japan.

Station layout
Tōjō Station features a single side platform serving one track. The station was originally built with two side platforms serving two tracks, however one of the platforms became inaccessible after the overpass connecting the two platforms was closed.

The station building is located beside the remaining platform. The station is only staffed during the morning hours, and is unattended otherwise.

Adjacent stations

History
The station opened on November 25, 1930 as a terminal station of the formerly Sanshin line to Yagami Station. The station became a through station on June 15, 1935 when the extension towards Onuka Station was opened. Service was renamed to the Geibi Line on July 1, 1937.

The station was transferred to JR West after the dissolution of JNR on April 1, 1987.

Surrounding area
The station serves the town of Tōjō. Hiroshima Prefectural Tōjō High School is located near the station. The Tōjō branches of the Shōbara City Offices and Police are also located nearby. Japan National Route 182 is accessible from the station as well.

References

External links
 JR West

Geibi Line
Railway stations in Hiroshima Prefecture
Railway stations in Japan opened in 1930
Shōbara, Hiroshima